Porphyrogenes is a Neotropical genus of spread-winged skippers in the family Hesperiidae, in which they are placed to tribe Phocidini.

Species
Porphyrogenes boliva Evans, 1952 - Venezuela
Porphyrogenes calathana (Hewitson, 1868)
P. calathana calanus (Godman & Salvin, 1894) 
P. calathana calathana (Hewitson, 1868)
P. calathana compusa (Hewitson, 1868)
Porphyrogenes convexus Austin & O. Mielke, 2008
Porphyrogenes despecta (Butler, 1870)
P. despecta despecta (Butler, 1870) - Brazil (Pará, Bahia)
P. despecta cervinus (Plötz, 1883) - Brazil
Porphyrogenes eudemus (Mabille, 1888)
Porphyrogenes ferruginea (Plötz, 1883)
Porphyrogenes glavia Evans, 1952 - Panama
Porphyrogenes passalus (Herrich-Schäffer, 1869) - Brazil (Amazonas) to Bolivia, Venezuela
Porphyrogenes omphale (Butler, 1871) - Venezuela
Porphyrogenes pausias (Hewitson, 1867) - Brazil (Amazonas)
Porphyrogenes peterwegei Burns, 2010
Porphyrogenes probus (Möschler, 1877) - Suriname, Colombia, Peru
Porphyrogenes simulator Austin & O. Mielke, 2008
Porphyrogenes sororcula (Mabille & Boullet, 1912) - French Guiana
Porphyrogenes sparus Austin & O. Mielke, 2008
Porphyrogenes spadix Austin & O. Mielke, 2008
Porphyrogenes spanda Evans, 1952 - Brazil (Pará)
Porphyrogenes sparta Evans, 1952 - Brazil (Pará)
Porphyrogenes speciosus Austin & O. Mielke, 2008 
Porphyrogenes specularis Austin & O. Mielke, 2008
Porphyrogenes spina Austin & O. Mielke, 2008 
Porphyrogenes splendidus Austin & O. Mielke, 2008
Porphyrogenes spoda Evans, 1952 - Panama
Porphyrogenes sporta Austin & O. Mielke, 2008 
Porphyrogenes stresa Evans, 1952  - Peru
Porphyrogenes stupa Evans, 1952 - type locality unknown
Porphyrogenes sula (R. Williams & E. Bell, 1940) 
Porphyrogenes virgatus (Mabille, 1888)
Porphyrogenes vulpecula (Plötz, 1882)
P. vulpecula vulpecula (Plötz, 1882) - Brazil, Panama
P. vulpecula immaculata (Skinner, 1920) - Peru
Porphyrogenes zohra (Möschler, 1879) - Venezuela, Peru, Honduras

References

Natural History Museum Lepidoptera genus database

External links
images representing Porphyrogenes at Consortium for the Barcode of Life

Eudaminae
Hesperiidae of South America
Hesperiidae genera
Taxa named by Edward Yerbury Watson